Joseph-Nicolas-Pancrace Royer (12 May 1703 – 11 January 1755) was a French composer, harpsichordist, organist, and administrator.

Biography
Born in Turin, Royer went to Paris in 1725, and in 1734 became maître de musique des enfants de France, responsible for the musical education of the children of the king, Louis XV. Together with the violinist Jean-Joseph de Mondonville, Royer directed the Concerts Spirituels, starting in 1748. Royer was at the Paris Opéra during the 1730s and the 1750s, writing six operas himself, of which the best known is the ballet héroïque Zaïde, reine de Grenade. In 1753 he acquired the prestigious position of music director of the chambre du roi (the king's chamber), and in the same year was named director of the Royal Opera orchestra. He died in Paris.

Works
Royer is particularly known for his often extravagant and virtuosic harpsichord music, especially "La Marche des Scythes" which ends his first book of harpsichord pieces.

Operas

Other works

1746: Premier livre de pièces de clavecin (1746)
 La Majestueuse, courante
 La Zaïde, rondeau (Tendrement)
 Les Matelots (Modérément)
 Premier et deuxième tambourins, suite des Matelots
 L'Incertaine (Marqué)
 L'Aimable (Gracieux)
 La Bagatelle
 Suitte de la Bagatelle
 La Remouleuse, rondeau (Modérément)
 Les tendre Sentiments, rondeau
 Le Vertigo, rondeau (Modérément)
 Allemande
 La Sensible, rondeau
 La marche des Scythes (Fièrement)
La chasse de Zaïde (1739)
1746: Ode à la fortune, text by Jean-Baptiste Rousseau, (first performance 25 December 1746, Concert Spirituel) 
1751: Venite exultemus, motet (first performance 18 December 1751, Concert Spirituel)

Recordings
Complete Harpsichord Music – Yago Mahugo (harpsichord), OnClassical (OC67B) licensed for Brilliant Classics (BC 94479), 2013
Pièces de Clavecin – William Christie (harpsichord), Harmonia Mundi France (HM1901037), recorded 1979, CD-release 1992 (out of print)

Notes

External links

1705 births
1755 deaths
Musicians from Turin
French Baroque composers
French classical composers
French male classical composers
French harpsichordists
French opera composers
Male opera composers
Opera managers
Directors of the Paris Opera
18th-century classical composers
18th-century keyboardists
18th-century French composers
18th-century Italian male musicians
Italian emigrants to France
17th-century male musicians